East Branch South Branch Kishwaukee River, in northern Illinois, is a  tributary of the Kishwaukee River, by way of the South Branch Kishwaukee River.

References

Kishwaukee, East South
Rivers of Illinois